The acronym MSHA can refer to:
 Maryland State Highway Administration, an agency of the Maryland Department of Transportation.
 Master of Science in Healthcare Administration, a graduate degree
 Mine Safety and Health Administration, an agency of the United States Department of Labor
 D-inositol-3-phosphate glycosyltransferase, an enzyme